All for Believing is the second extended play (EP) by Australian indie pop singer songwriter, Missy Higgins.
It was released exclusively in the US in January 2005 as an introduction. Her debut studio album, The Sound of White was released in the US on 7 June 2005.

Reception
Johnny Loftus from AllMusic gave the EP 3 out of 5 saying; "Designed as a calling card for her eventual domestic full-length, the brief set showcases Higgins' engaging vocal style and knack for balladry." adding "Higgins keeps "Believing" basic, heightening its dramatic sweep with subtle washes of cello and violin."

Track listing
 "All for Believing" - 3:30
 "Ten Days" - 3:48
 "Scar"	- 3:36
 "Nightminds" - 3:20
 "Any Day Now" - 3:52

Release history

References

2005 EPs
EPs by Australian artists
Missy Higgins albums